Platelet-derived growth factor subunit B is a protein that in humans is encoded by the PDGFB gene.

Function 

The protein encoded by this gene is a member of the platelet-derived growth factor family. The four members of this family are mitogenic factors for cells of mesenchymal origin and are characterized by a motif of eight cysteines. This gene product can exist either as a homodimer (PDGF-BB) or as a heterodimer with the platelet-derived growth factor alpha (PDGFA)  polypeptide (PDGF-AB), where the dimers are connected by disulfide bonds.

Clinical significance 

Mutations in this gene are associated with meningioma. Reciprocal translocations between chromosomes 22 and 17, at sites where the PDGFB and COL1A1 genes are respectively located or, alternatively, an abnormal small supernumerary ring chromosome merge these two genes to form a COL1A-PDGFB fusion gene. This fusion gene greatly overproduces PDGFB and is considered responsible for causing the development and/or progression of three closely related fibroblastic and myofibroblastic tumors of the skin: giant cell fibroblastoma, dermatofibrosarcoma protuberans, and dermatofibrosarcoma protuberans, sarcomatous. 

Two splice variants have been identified for the PDGFB gene.

See also
Platelet-derived growth factor

References

Further reading

Growth factors